In June through August 2022, parts of Europe, the Middle East and North Africa were affected by wildfires. The bulk of the fires affected Mediterranean Countries, with the main areas affected being Algeria, France, Greece, Portugal and Spain.

By country

Albania 
There were also large fires reported in Lezhë County.

Algeria 

Wildfires which broke out in August have killed at least 38 people, 24 in the city of El Tarf, and injured at least 200 others. They caused 350 people to be evacuated, according to Minister of Interior Kamel Beldjoud.

Croatia 
Three large wildfires in the Zadar and Šibenik area destroyed around 20 homes in the village of Raslina by Lake Prokljan. The fire was extinguished by 18 July.

Cyprus 
On 23 June, a wildfire destroyed at least  of forest on the foothills of the Kyrenia Mountains.

Czech Republic 

A forest fire occurred in the Bohemian Switzerland National Park on 24 July 2022. It has been burning during large heatwaves, in the difficult-to-access terrain of the Malinový důl gorge in the national park area near Hřensko. Firefighters have been working since Sunday morning, they also evacuated dozens of tourists, 60 people from the camp in Dolský mlýn and residents of the village of Mezná. Firefighters and helicopters from Poland, Slovakia, Sweden and Germany also responded to the fire.

On 26 July, the smell of smoke from a forest fire was noticed as far away as Vysočina, Prague, Ústí nad Orlicí District, Svitavy District and Dresden. As of 26 July, the fire affected  of forest.

France

July Gironde Fires 

The fire at La Teste-de-Buch started at around 15:00 on 12 July. The mayor of La Teste-de-Buch, Patrick Davet, said that the cause of the fire may have been a vehicle that could have had electrical problems and ignited a fire on the side of a road near the Dune of Pilat.

In the evening, authorities evacuated five hamlets and the village of Guillos near Landiras as a precautionary measure. Five hundred people were evacuated and no casualties were reported from this fire. The D115 and D125 roads were closed to traffic.

On 13 July, in the area close to the fire, an evacuation of five campsites began, with around 6,000 holidaymakers fleeing as a cautionary measure. They were sent to the exhibition centre and the Leclerc shopping centre in La Teste-de-Buch. The D218 road was cut off by the fire between Pilat and the beach at Biscarosse. No injuries were reported. At the La Teste-de-Buch fire,  in the district of Arcachon had been burnt since 12 July.

At the Landiras fire,  had been burnt since 12 July and no injuries were reported. The prefecture activated two operational command posts manned by the SDIS of the Gironde to coordinate operations. Nearly six hundred firefighters were engaged to fight the fire. Two Canadair water bombers were deployed and two Dash aircraft, with additional reinforcements allocated from other areas of France.

By the morning of 14 July,  had been burnt in Arcachon near La Teste-de-Buch with no injuries reported. The fire was not under control and was difficult to access. From 5 a.m., sixty people were evacuated from an area north of Cazaux. The D218 road remained cut between the roundabout at Pilat and the beach at Biscarosse remained closed. By the early evening,  had been destroyed as two houses and campsites near the lake were under threat. Further evacuations took place in the afternoon around Cazaux and 4,000 evacuees were now being housed as a reception centre at La Teste-de-Buch.

In Landiras,  had burnt near Langon by the morning with no injuries reported. The fire was not under control and the D115, D125 and D220 roads were closed. Guillos and the hamlets of Lahon and Hil et Petit-Hil were evacuated and by the evening, the fire had burnt through .

Nearly one thousand firefighters, four Canadairs and two Dash aircraft had been mobilised. The prefect, Fabienne Buccio placed the Gironde department on Orange alert due to the weather conditions and the risk of other forest fires.
By the morning of 15 July,  had burnt at the La Teste-de-Buch, the fire having reached the lake at Cazaux while 10,000 people had been evacuated so far. The fire was still not under control and at Cazaux three houses and two restaurants had been destroyed. Bulldozers were brought in to attempt to build firebreaks ahead of the fire. Around a thousand firefighters, three Canadairs and one Dash aircraft were being deployed to fight the fires in both areas that morning.

Evacuees from the campsites around La Teste-de-Buch, evacuated since 12 July, returned on 15 July, with individuals allowed to return to the sites to pack up their camping gear and luggage. Most inhabitants of Cazaux were not allowed back to check on their homes and pets.

Further evacuations had been carried out throughout the day at Louchats, Origne, Balizac and La Broque with around 1,900 evacuated. One house at Guillos had been destroyed and more roads closed in the fire area.

Greece and Italy made two Canadair water bombers available for France. They arrived in France that morning, being mobilised to the south of France. President Emmanuel Macron visited the Ministry of Interior's crisis centre in Paris to be briefed on the progress to fight the fire.

On 16 July, some inhabitants of Cazaux were allowed through to retrieve belongings and pets while others could not go due to the road to the town being overrun again by fire. The fire at La Teste-de-Buch fire was contained but still burning with the possibility of becoming out of control if the temperatures stayed high and the winds rise again.

The town of Cabanac-et-Villagrains was evacuated as were 1,900 people from the Hostens. At Hostens, an evacuation order was issued but residents were not obliged to leave and if they chose to stay, they had to declare that position. The amount of vegetation and forest burnt in the two fires now stood at under . Two new accommodation centres were opened in Saucats and Belin-Béliet.

Aerial water bombers dropped  of fire retardant on the fire fronts to stop the progress of the fire. It had been reported that so far only four firefighters were injured, one fire appliance overturned and one was burnt. Three thousand buildings had been saved.

President of the Gironde Departmental Council, Jean-Luc Gleyze pleaded for more Canadair and Dash aircraft on site to fight the fire as some Canadair water bombers had been moved to other areas in France. Some, he complained, had arrived too late and made containing the fire harder. He said if the fire at La Teste-de-Buch could be contained between the coast and Lac de Cazaux, then more resources could then be moved to the Landiras.

Jean-Marc Pelletant, mayor of Landiras said a team of prosecutors from Bordeaux had arrived and were investigating if there was any criminal activity responsible for the fire, a situation he was not aware of.
On 17 July, the evacuation of 2,100 people in Cabanac began during the day with more than 16,000 people evacuated since 12 July. The prefecture announced at midday that around  had been burnt in the two fires. 1,500 firemen from all over France were fighting the fire. At the La Teste-de-Buch fire,  had burnt while at the Landiras fire,  had been lost.

Midday at the La-Teste-de-Buch fire, saw the construction of firebreaks continued with the fire fought on left and right flanks to protect campsites and dwellings. During the day at the Landiras fire, the DFCI (Défense des Forêts Contre les Incendies) continued to build firebreaks in front of the fire. And at Landiras, the fire had several fronts when the wind changed. Resources to fight the fire had been increased but were still to deploy with an additional three aircraft, two hundred firefighters and eleven more fire appliances allocated. In the Landiras region, two new shelters were opened in Langon while one was closed at Saucats.

On 18 July, in the La Teste-de-Buch and Landiras areas, more than 16,000 people were evacuated as fires continue to spread across Gironde.

In Brasparts, Monts d'Arrée, Finistère, a large moorland fire started, forcing the evacuation of 300 people while more than 1700 hectares burned. It was caused by two distinct fires a few kilometers apart, both of human origin, one obviously criminal according to Quimper prosecutor Carine Halley.

August Gironde Fires 
Firefighters from Poland, Romania, Austria and Germany and helicopters from Greece, Italy and Sweden helped extinguish the fires.

Germany 
 	On 25 July, a forest fire covering an area of  led to the evacuation of 700 people in the villages of Rehfeld and Kölsa in the state of Brandenburg. Seven firefighters suffered injuries.

Wildfires in the Czech Republic crossed the border to the Saxon Switzerland on 25 July 2022 with fires near Großer Winterberg and Kirnitzschtal.

On 4 August, a fire broke out at an explosives disposal site in Grunewald, a forest in Berlin.

Greece 
Wildfires broke out on 14 July, affecting areas near Preveza. Seven villages near Rethymno were evacuated because of fires.

On 19 July, a wildfire broke out near the Pantokratoros Monastery. The villages of Drafi and Pallini were evacuated.

Italy 
A wildfire broke out on 15 July in a corn field in Bibione, San Michele al Tagliamento.On the evening of 18 July a large fire breaks out in Massarosa (Province of Lucca), which in 5 days has destroyed beyond 900 hectares (at 22 July) until it reaches the Province of Pisa.

Lebanon 
On 9 July, a large wildfire engulfed a pine forest near Nabatieh.

Malta 
On 18 July, a wildfire broke out in grassland in Mriehel.

Morocco 
In July 2022, at the same time as wildfires across Europe, Morocco was affected by large wildfires as a result of historic heatwaves. The Royal Moroccan Armed Forces and firefighters have struggled to get the situation under control. The forests of Taza, Tetouan and Larache have been burning. 500 families were evacuated from the provinces of Larache and Taza. 1,331 families were evacuated from 20 villages, and around 170 houses were destroyed south of the port of Tangier.

Portugal 

The Algarve region and the districts of Leiria and Santarém have been most affected by wildfires. One fireplane pilot was killed when the plane crashed. In Leiria, a fire blocked a part of the A1 which runs from Porto to Lisbon. In Algarve, a fire broke out in the city of Faro, which spread to the Quinta do Lago resort. A fire in the municipality of Palmela in the Lisbon metropolitan area burned  of bush and caused 12 injuries. According to the Civil Protection Authority, at least 135 people have been injured since wildfires began, and about 800 people have been evacuated from their homes.

On 31 July, firefighters battled a large wildfire in the municipality of Mafra near the town of Venda do Pinheiro.

On 21 August, a wildfire broke out in the Vila Real District. A fire tornado was filmed in the area.

Romania 
On 5 July, a wildfire destroyed 100 hectares of a wheat field in Timiș County.

Slovenia 
On 17 July, wildfires broke out in the Karst region on the Italy–Slovenia border and more than 300 firefighters were battling the flames. The Karst wildfires continued to spread until 20 July, causing evacuations of a number of villages. There were several foreign aircraft that assisted the domestic ones in battling the flames and monitoring the affected areas. Approximately  of land were burnt, making it the most extensive spread of wildfires ever recorded in Slovenia. On 22 July, when the Karst wildfires started to spread again, there were more than 800 firefighters and 260 foresters on location.

In the early morning of 24 July, there were rain showers in the Karst region, but precipitation only occurred in part of the areas affected by the Karst wildfires, which continued to burn due to strong winds and high temperatures. By the end of the day, approximately 2,000 people and several domestic as well as foreign aircraft succeeded in stopping these wildfires from spreading further. On 25 July, they were confirmed to be under control, but not yet fully extinguished, after burning an estimated  of land in the municipalities of Miren–Kostanjevica and Renče–Vogrsko. At that time, many of the people who fought the flames the previous day already left the affected areas and all foreign aircraft returned to their home countries. As strong winds and slow-burning flames could still start a new spread, a total of 518 people, including approximately 325 firefighters, kept monitoring the situation in the most critical parts of the affected areas.

Although there were periods of rain in the Karst region on 26 July, precipitation in the areas affected by the Karst wildfires was low. As it was assessed that strong winds could still contribute to flames igniting in natural environments, a total of 143 firefighters remained on location during the day and their number was reduced to 58 during the night. In the early morning of 27 July, a wildfire broke out at a previously unaffected location in the municipality of Komen, but it was soon put under control by a total of 180 firefighters and only an estimated  of land were burnt. A number of smaller fires also broke out in the previously affected areas as firefighters and helicopter crews continued to monitor the situation. In the days that followed, they only reported minor fires that burned without spreading and did not register any significant changes on the Slovenian side of the border. However, a new wildfire started to spread on the Italian side of the border on 28 July, which caused up to 60 Slovenian firefighters and one helicopter to relocate there and assist in the efforts to put it under control. After new periods of rain in the Karst region on 30 July, the Karst wildfires were under control on both sides of the border. However, they were not yet considered fully extinguished and the affected areas on the Slovenian side of the border were monitored by up to 60 firefighters.

On 1 August, it was announced that 10 firefighters would continue to monitor these affected areas as long as it would be assessed that flames could ignite in natural environments. The estimation in regard to the land area affected by the Karst wildfires on the Slovenian side of the border was updated to  that day, of which approximately 82% were in the municipality of Miren–Kostanjevica. The blazes mostly affected forests and grasslands, but also olive groves and vineyards. They destroyed a mountain hut and several small agricultural buildings, but did not cause any damage to residential buildings and only around 60 cases of minor injuries were recorded. On 3 August, it was reported that the areas affected by the Karst wildfires on the Slovenian side of the border would be cleared of burnt wood within three weeks.

On 1 August, a wildfire broke out on a hill in the vicinity of Lake Bled, a popular tourist destination, affecting a forest and burning above a railway tunnel, but it was extinguished within hours.

On 9 August, a wildfire broke out in a previously unaffected area on the Italy–Slovenia border, burning in a shrubland in the hills near Socerb in the municipality of Koper, further south from the areas affected by the July wildfires in the Karst region. After the blaze was noticed during the night, approximately 80 firefighters and two helicopters were activated to stop its spread. It was thought to be under control by noon, but it started spreading again during the afternoon, when approximately 120 firefighters and several aircraft from both sides of the border were battling the flames. In the evening, the wildfire was reported to be under control, but the location was still closely monitored due to the blowing of the bora. On the morning of 11 August, it was reported that the wildfire was extinguished. The affected area, which encompassed an estimated  of land, was watered and monitored by approximately 150 firefighters and several aircraft the previous day.

On 10 August, there were three smaller forest fires near Radovljica, which were extinguished within hours. They broke out next to a railway and were confirmed to have been caused by the braking of a train.

In the early afternoon of 17 August, a forest fire broke out in the hills near Zalog, a neighbourhood on the outskirts of the capital Ljubljana. Two helicopters and more than 110 firefighters were activated to stop its spread. As the night fell, around 60 firefighters stayed on location and successfully put the blaze under control. The area it affected is accessible only by foot and no residential buildings were in danger.

On 19 August, a warning of heightened risk of fires breaking out in natural environments, which was issued for several municipalities on 20 July, was lifted in the municipalities of Miren–Kostanjevica, Renče–Vogrsko and Komen, which were affected by the July wildfires in the Karst region, as well as in the municipality of Koper, which was affected by the wildfire near Socerb earlier in August.

Spain 

Wildfires broke out in the Sierra de Mijas mountains, which forced 2,300 to flee near the Costa del Sol.

In Aragon, on July 18 a fire started in Ateca, burning 14,000 hectares. On August 13 another fire starts, in the Moncayo Range, burning 6,000 hectares. On 14 August, more than 1,500 people were evacuated from Zaragoza, Spain, due to wildfires.

Tunisia 
On 19 June, a wildfire broke out in Jebel Boukornine near the capital Tunis.

Turkey 
On 24 June, a wildfire raged in the Bördübet region, near Marmaris on the Aegean Sea coast.

On 13 July, a wildfire broke out on the Datça Peninsula. 450 houses and 3,530 people were evacuated from the area.

United Kingdom 

In 2022, there were nearly 25,000 wildfires across the United Kingdom.

On 23 April, a large wildfire broke out on Canford Heath in Dorset. Dozens of animals were reported killed, and Dorset Wildlife Trust said that it would take 15 years for the heath to be restored. On 25 April, Dorset & Wiltshire Fire and Rescue Service investigators said that the fire was started deliberately. On 14 May yet another fire broke out on the heath. On 22 May, a third fire broke out. The fire service confirmed that it was once again due to "human intervention".

On 13 August, a wildfire burned near West Calder in West Lothian for three days.

On 20 August, a heath fire was extinguished on Dewlands Common in Verwood, Dorset. On 21 August, a wildfire burned on Bourne Valley Nature Reserve in Dorset.

See also

 2022 European heat waves
 2022 United Kingdom heat waves
 Climate change in Europe
 Climate change in the Middle East and North Africa

References

European and Mediterranean
2022 meteorology
2022 fires in Africa
2022 fires in Asia
2022 fires in Europe
July 2022 events in Africa
July 2022 events in Asia
July 2022 events in Europe
August 2022 events in Europe
2022 fires in the United Kingdom